Rockland is a town in Manitowoc County, Wisconsin, United States. The population was 896 at the 2000 census. The unincorporated community of Collins is located in the town. The unincorporated community of Wells is also partially located in the town.

Geography
According to the United States Census Bureau, the town has a total area of 35.5 square miles (92.0 km2), of which, 34.5 square miles (89.4 km2) of it is land and 1.0 square miles (2.6 km2) of it (2.84%) is water.

Demographics
As of the census of 2000, there were 896 people, 308 households, and 255 families residing in the town. The population density was 26.0 people per square mile (10.0/km2). There were 336 housing units at an average density of 9.7 per square mile (3.8/km2). The racial makeup of the town was 98.21% White, 0.45% Native American, 1.00% from other races, and 0.33% from two or more races. Hispanic or Latino of any race were 1.79% of the population.

There were 308 households, out of which 38.6% had children under the age of 18 living with them, 75.0% were married couples living together, 4.2% had a female householder with no husband present, and 17.2% were non-families. 13.6% of all households were made up of individuals, and 5.8% had someone living alone who was 65 years of age or older. The average household size was 2.91 and the average family size was 3.23.

In the town, the population was spread out, with 26.5% under the age of 18, 7.1% from 18 to 24, 31.1% from 25 to 44, 25.8% from 45 to 64, and 9.5% who were 65 years of age or older. The median age was 36 years. For every 100 females, there were 109.3 males. For every 100 females age 18 and over, there were 109.2 males.

The median income for a household in the town was $53,500, and the median income for a family was $56,635. Males had a median income of $34,219 versus $22,625 for females. The per capita income for the town was $19,798. About 6.4% of families and 7.9% of the population were below the poverty line, including 13.4% of those under age 18 and 10.8% of those age 65 or over.

Notable people

 Martin Rappel, farmer, businessman, and politician, was born in the town

References

Towns in Manitowoc County, Wisconsin
Towns in Wisconsin